Police Act is a stock short title used for legislation in India, Malaysia and the United Kingdom relating to police forces and officers.

List

India
Indian Police Act 1861

Malaysia
The Police Act 1967

United Kingdom

The Police (Property) Act 1897
The Police Act 1909
The Police Act 1919
The Police (Overseas Service) Act 1945
The Police Act 1946
The Police Act 1964
The Police Act 1969
The Police Act 1972
The Police Act 1976
The Police and Criminal Evidence Act 1984
The Police and Magistrates' Courts Act 1994
The Police Act 1996
The Police (Property) Act 1997
The Police (Health and Safety) Act 1997
The Police (Insurance of Voluntary Assistants) Act 1997
The Police Act 1997
The Police and Justice Act 2006
The Police (Detention and Bail) Act 2011

The Police Acts 1839 to 1893 was the collective title of the following Acts:
The County Police Act 1839 (2 & 3 Vict c 93)
The County Police Act 1840 (3 & 4 Vict c 88)
The County and Borough Police Act 1856 (19 & 20 Vict c 69)
The County Police Act 1857 (20 Vict c 2)
The County and Borough Police Act 1859 (22 & 23 Vict c 32)
The Police Superannuation Act 1865 (28 & 29 Vict c 35)
Sections 190 to 194 of the Municipal Corporations Act 1882 (45 & 46 Vict c 50)
The Police Act 1890 (53 & 54 Vict c 45)
The Police Act 1893 (56 & 57 Vict c 10)

The Town Police Clauses Acts 1847 and 1889 is the collective title of the Town Police Clauses Act 1847 (10 & 11 Vict c 89) and the Town Police Clauses Act 1889 (52 & 53 Vict c 14).

Scotland

The Burgh Police (Scotland) Act 1833 (3 & 4 Will 4 c 46)
The Glasgow Police Act 1800
The General Police (Scotland) Act 1847 (10 & 11 Vict c 39)
The Police of Towns (Scotland) Act 1850 (13 & 14 Vict c 33)
The General and Police Improvement (Scotland) Act 1862 (25 & 26 Vict c 101)
The Burgh Police (Scotland) Act 1892 (55 & 56 Vict c 55)
The Burgh Police (Scotland) Act 1903 (3 Edw 7 c 33)

The Police (Scotland) Acts 1857 to 1890 was the collective title of the following Acts:
The Police (Scotland) Act 1857 (20 & 21 Vict c 72)
The Police (Scotland) Act 1858 (21 & 22 Vict c 65)
The Police (Scotland) Act 1890 (53 & 54 Vict c 67)

Northern Ireland
The Police (Northern Ireland) Act 1998
The Police (Northern Ireland) Act 2000
The Police (Northern Ireland) Act 2003

See also
List of short titles

References

Lists of legislation by short title and collective title
Police legislation